A mire, peatland, or quagmire is a wetland area dominated by living peat-forming plants. Mires arise because of incomplete decomposition of organic matter, usually litter from vegetation, due to water-logging and subsequent anoxia. All types of mires share the common characteristic of being saturated with water, at least seasonally with actively forming peat, while having their own ecosystem. Like coral reefs, mires are unusual landforms that derive mostly from biological rather than physical processes, and can take on characteristic shapes and surface patterning.

A quagmire is a floating (quaking) mire, bog, or any peatland being in a stage of hydrosere or hydrarch (hydroseral) succession, resulting in pond-filling yields underfoot. Ombrotrophic types of quagmire may be called quaking bog (quivering bog). Minerotrophic types can be named with the term quagfen.

There are four types of mire: bog, fen, marsh and swamp. A bog is a mire that, due to its location relative to the surrounding landscape, obtains most of its water from rainfall (ombrotrophic). A fen is located on a slope, flat, or in a depression and gets most of its water from soil or groundwater (minerotrophic). Thus, while a bog is always acidic and nutrient-poor, a fen may be slightly acidic, neutral, or alkaline, and either nutrient-poor or nutrient-rich. A marsh is a type of wetland within which vegetation is rooted in mineral soil but some marshes form shallow peat deposits well known as Mires. Swamps are characterized by their forest canopy and, like fens, are typically of higher pH level and nutrient availability than bogs. Some bogs and fens can support limited shrub or tree growth on hummocks.

The formation of mires today is primarily controlled by climatic conditions such as precipitation and temperature, although terrain relief is a major factor as waterlogging occurs more easily on flatter ground. However, there is a growing anthropogenic influence in the accumulation of peat and peatlands around the world, including through both conservation efforts as well as climate change-induced destruction by droughts and forest fires. Topographically, mires elevate the ground surface above the original topography. Mires can reach considerable heights above the underlying mineral soil or bedrock: peat depths of above 10m have been commonly recorded in temperate regions (many temperate and most boreal mires were removed by ice sheets in the last Ice Age), and above 25 m in tropical regions.[7] When the absolute decay rate in the catotelm (the lower, water-saturated zone of a mire) matches the rate of input of new peat into the catotelm, the mire will stop growing in height.[8] A simplistic calculation, using typical values for a Sphagnum bog of 1mm new peat added per year and 0.0001 proportion of the catotelm decaying per year, gives a maximum height of 10 m. More advanced analyses incorporate expectable nonlinear rates of catotelm decay.

For botanists and ecologists, the term peatland is a more general term for any terrain dominated by peat to a depth of at least , even if it has been completely drained (i.e., a peatland can be dry, but a mire by definition must be actively forming peat).

Global distribution

Mires, although at their greatest extent at high latitudes in the Northern Hemisphere, are found around the globe. Estimating the extent of mire land cover worldwide is difficult due to the varying accuracy and methodologies of land surveys from many countries. Mires occur wherever conditions are right for peat accumulation: largely where organic matter is constantly waterlogged. Hence the distribution of mires is dependent on topography, climate, parent material, biota, and time. The type of mire – bog, fen, marsh or swamp – depends also on each of these factors.

The largest accumulations of mires constitute of around 64% of global peatlands and are found in the temperate, boreal and subarctic zones of the Northern Hemisphere. Mires are usually shallow in polar regions because of the slow rate of accumulation of dead organic matter and is often known to contain permafrost. Very large swathes of Canada, northern Europe and northern Russia are covered by boreal mires. In temperate areas mires are typically more scattered due to historical drainage and peat extraction but can cover large areas. One example is blanket bog where precipitation is very high i.e., in maritime climates inland near the coasts of the north-east and south Pacific, and the north-west and north-east Atlantic. In the sub-tropics, mires are rare and restricted to the wettest areas.

Mires can be extensive in the tropics, typically underlying tropical rainforest (for example, in Kalimantan). Tropical peat formation is known to occur in coastal mangroves as well as in areas of high altitude. Tropical mires largely form where high precipitation is combined with poor conditions for drainage. Tropical mires account for around 11% of peatlands globally (more than half of which can be found in Southeast Asia), and are most commonly found at low altitudes, although they can also be found in mountainous regions, for example in South America, Africa and Papua New Guinea. Recently, the world's largest tropical mire was found in the Central Congo Basin, covering 145,500 square kilometres and it may store up to 1013 kg of carbon.

Mires have declined globally due to drainage for agriculture, forestry, and for peat harvesting. For example, more than 50% of original European mire area which is more than 300,000 square kilometers has been lost. Some of the largest losses have been in Russia, Finland, the Netherlands, the United Kingdom, Poland and Belarus.

Bio-chemical processes

Mires have unusual chemistry that influences, inter alia, their biota and water outflow. Peat has very high cation-exchange capacity due to its high organic matter content: cations such as Ca2+ are preferentially adsorbed onto the peat in exchange for H+ ions. Water passing through peat declines in nutrients and in pH. Therefore, mires are typically nutrient-poor and acidic unless the inflow of groundwater (bringing in supplementary cations) is high.

Generally, whenever the inputs of carbon exceed carbon outputs, mires are formed. This occurs due to the anoxic state of water-logged peat, and the process of photosynthesis by which peat grows. Despite accounting for just 3% of Earth's land surfaces, mires are collectively a major carbon store containing between 500 and 700 billion tonnes of carbon. Carbon stored within mires equates to over half the amount of carbon found in the atmosphere. Mires interact with the atmosphere primarily through the exchange of carbon dioxide, methane and nitrous oxide, and can be damaged by excess nitrogen from agriculture or rainwater. The sequestration of carbon dioxide takes place at the surface via the process of photosynthesis, while losses of carbon dioxide occur through living peat tissue via respiration. In their natural state, mires are a slight atmospheric carbon dioxide sink through the photosynthesis of peat vegetation, which outweighs their release of greenhouse gases. In addition, most mires are generally net emitters of methane and nitrous oxide.

The water table position of a mire is responsible for its carbon release to the atmosphere. When the water table rises post rainstorm, the peat and its microbes are submerged under water inhibiting access to oxygen, reducing respiration, and releasing carbon dioxide. Carbon dioxide release increases when the water table shrinks, such as during a drought, as this supplies the aerobic microbes with oxygen to decompose the peat. Levels of methane also vary with the water table position and somewhat with temperature. A water table near the peat surface gives the opportunity for anaerobic microorganisms to flourish. Methanogens are responsible for producing methane via decomposition of the peat which consequently increases as the water table rises and oxygen levels are depleted. Increased temperatures in the soil also contributes to increased seasonal methane flux, though at a lower intensity. It is shown that the methane increased by as much as 300% seasonal from increased precipitation and temperature of the soil.

Mires are important reservoirs of climatic information to the past because they are sensitive to changes in the environment and can reveal levels of isotopes, pollutants, macrofossils, metals from the atmosphere, and pollen. For example, carbon-14 dating can reveal the age of the peat. The dredging and destruction of a mire will release the carbon dioxide that could reveal irreplaceable information about the past climatic conditions.  It is widely known that a plethora of microorganisms inhabit mires due to the regular supply of water and abundance of peat forming vegetation. These microorganisms include but are not limited to methanogens, algae, bacteria, zoobenthos, of which Sphagnum species are most abundant. The peat in mires contain a substantial amount of organic matter, where humic acid dominates. Humic materials are able to store very large amounts of water, making them an essential component in the peat environment, contributing to an increased amount of carbon storage due to the resulting anaerobic condition. If the peatland is dried from long-term cultivation and agricultural use, it will lower the water table and the increased aeration will subsequently release carbon content. Upon extreme drying, the ecosystem can undergo a state shift, turning the mire into a barren land with lower biodiversity and richness. The formation of humic acid occurs during the biogeochemical degradation of vegetation debris, animal residue, and degraded segments. The loads of organic matter in the form of humic acid is a source of precursors of coal. Prematurely exposing the organic matter to the atmosphere promotes the conversion of organics to carbon dioxide to be released in the atmosphere.

Use by humans 
Records of past human behaviour and environments can be contained within mires. These may take the form of human artefacts, or palaeoecological and geochemical records.

Mires are used by humans in modern times for a range of purposes, the most dominant being agriculture and forestry, which accounts for around a quarter of global peatland area. This involves cutting drainage ditches to lower the water table with the intended purpose of enhancing the productivity of forest cover or for use as pasture or cropland. Agricultural uses for mires include the use of natural vegetation for hay crop or grazing, or the cultivation of crops on a modified surface. In addition, the commercial harvest of peat from mires for energy production is widely practiced in Northern European countries, such as Russia, Sweden, Finland and the Baltic states.

In Southeast Asia, mires are cleared for human use for a variety of reasons, including the production of palm oil and timber for export in primarily developing nations. Tropical peatlands, which comprise 0.25% of Earth's terrestrial land surface but store 3% of all soil and forest carbon stocks, are mostly located in low-income countries. The use of this land by humans, including draining and harvesting of tropical peat forests, results in the emission of large amounts of carbon dioxide into the atmosphere. In addition, fires occurring on peatland dried by the draining of peat bogs release even more carbon dioxide. The economic value of a tropical peatland was once derived from raw materials, such as wood, bark, resin, and latex, the extraction of which did not contribute to large carbon emissions. Today, many of these peatlands are drained for conversion to palm oil plantations, releasing stored carbon dioxide and preventing the system from sequestering carbon again. The planned "Carbopeat Project" attempts to assign economic value to the carbon sequestration performed by peat bogs, to stop the development of this land.

Tropical mires 
The global distribution of tropical mires is mostly concentrated to Southeast Asia where agricultural use of peatlands has been developed in recent decades. Large areas of tropical peatlands have been cleared and drained for food and cash crops such as palm oil plantation. Large scale drainage of these plantations often results in subsidence, flooding, fire, and deterioration of soil quality. Small scale encroachment on the other hand, is linked to poverty and is so wide spread that it as well has a negative impact on these peatlands. The biotic and abiotic factors controlling the Southeast Asian peatlands are completely interdependent. Its soil, hydrology and morphology are created by the present vegetation through the accumulation of its own organic matter where it builds a favorable environment for this specific vegetation. This system is therefore vulnerable to changes in hydrology or vegetation cover. Furthermore, these peatlands are mostly located in developing regions with impoverished and rapidly growing populations. The lands have there for become target for commercial logging, paper pulp production and conversion to plantations through clear-cutting, drainage and burning. Drainage of tropical peatlands alters the hydrology and increases their susceptibility to fire and soil erosion, as a consequence of changes in physical and chemical compositions. The change in soil strongly effects the sensitive vegetation and forest die-off is common.  The short-term effect is a decrease in biodiversity but the long-term effect, since these encroachments are hard to reverse, is a loss of habitat. Poor knowledge about peatlands sensitive hydrology and lack of nutrients often lead to failing plantations where pressure increases on remaining peatlands.

Sustainable forestry in these peatlands is possible by cutting large trees and letting smaller individuals flourish but instead clear-cutting and burning to enable monocultural plantation of non-indigenous species is the predominant strategy.

Northern peatlands were mostly built up during Holocene after the retreat of Pleistocene glaciers but in contrast the tropical ones are often much older. Nakaikemi Wetland in southwest Honshu, Japan is more than 50,000 years old and has a depth of 45 m. The Philippi Peatland in Greece has probably one of the deepest peat layers with a depth of 190 m. Tropical peatlands are suggested to contain about 100 Gt carbon and is corresponding to more than 50% of the carbon present as CO2 in the atmosphere. Accumulation rates of carbon during the last millennium were close to 40 g C/m2/yr.

Greenhouse gases and fires 
According to the IPCC Sixth Assessment Report, the conservation and restoration of wetlands and peatlands has large economic potential to mitigate greenhouse gas emissions, providing benefits for adaptation, mitigation, and biodiversity.

The tropical peatlands in Southeast Asia only cover 0,2% of earths land area but CO2 emissions are estimated to 2 Gt per year which is equal to 7% of the global fossil fuel emissions. These emissions get bigger with drainage and burning of peatlands and a severe fire can release up to 4000 t of CO2/ha. Burning events in tropical peatlands are becoming more frequent due to large scale drainage and land clearance and in the past 10 years, more than 2 million ha was burnt in Southeast Asia alone. These fires last typically for 1–3 months and are releasing large amounts of CO2. Indonesia is one of the countries suffering from peatland fires, especially during years with ENSO-related drought, an increasing problem since 1982 as a result of developing land use and agriculture. During the El Niño-event in 1997-1998 more than 24,400 km2 of peatland was lost to fires in Indonesia alone from which 10,000 km2 was burnt in Kalimantan and Sumatra. The output of CO2 was estimated to 0.81–2.57 Gt, equal to 13–40% of that year’s global output from fossil fuel burning. Indonesia is now considered the 3rd biggest contributor to global CO2 emissions, caused primarily by these fires. With a warming climate these burnings are expected to increase in intensity and number. This is a result of a dry climate together with an extensive rice farming project, called The Mega Rice Project, started in the 1990s where 1 Mha of peatlands was converted to rice paddies. Forest and land was cleared by burning and 4000 km of channels drained the area. Drought and acidification of the lands led to bad harvest and the project was abandoned in 1999. Similar projects in China have led to immense loss of tropical marshes and fens due to rice production. Drainage, which also increases the risk of burning, can cause additional emissions of CO2 by 30–100 t/ha/year if the water table is lowered with only 1 m. The draining of peatlands is probably the most important and long lasting threat to peatlands all over the world but especially in the tropics. Peatlands do release the greenhouse gas methane that has strong global warming potential, but subtropical wetlands have shown high CO2 binding per mol of released methane, which is a function that counteracts global warming.

Biology and peat characteristics 
The vegetation of tropical peatlands varies with climate and location. Three different characterizations are mangrove woodlands present in the littoral zones and deltas of salty water, followed inland by swamp forests. These forests occur on the margin of peatlands with a palm rich flora with trees 70 m tall and 8 m in girth accompanied by ferns and epiphytes.  The third one, Padang, from the Malaysian and Indonesian word for forest, consists of shrubs and tall but thin trees and appear in the center of large peatlands. The diversity of woody species, like trees and shrubs, are far greater in the tropical peatlands than in peatlands of other types. The peat in the tropics is therefore dominated by woody material from trunks of trees and shrubs and contain little to no sphagnum moss that dominates in boreal peatlands. It's only partly decomposed and the surface consists of a thick layer of leaf litter. Forestry in peatlands leads to drainage and rapid carbon losses since it decreases inputs of organic matter and accelerate the decomposition. In contrast to temperate wetlands the tropical peatlands are home to several species of fish. Many new, often endemic, species has been discovered lately but many of them are considered threatened.

Impacts on global climate 
Wetlands provide an environment where organic carbon is stored in living plants, dead plants and peat, as well as converted to carbon dioxide and methane. Three main factors giving wetlands the ability to sequester and store carbon are the high biological productivity, high water table and low decomposition rates. Suitable meteorological and hydrological conditions are necessary to provide an abundant water source for the wetland. Fully water-saturated wetland soils allow anaerobic conditions to manifest, storing carbon but releasing methane.

Wetlands make up about 5-8% of Earth's terrestrial land surface but contain about 20-30% of the planet's 2500 Gt soil carbon stores.  Mires (e.g., bogs, fens and marshes) are the wetland types that contain the highest amounts of soil organic carbon, and can thus be considered peatlands (a peat layer >30 cm). Wetlands can become sources of carbon, rather than sinks, as the decomposition occurring within the ecosystem emits methane. Natural peatlands do not always have a measurable cooling effect on the climate in a short time span as the cooling effects of sequestering carbon are offset by the emission of methane, which is a strong greenhouse gas. However, given the short "lifetime" of methane (12 years), it is often said that methane emissions are unimportant within 300 years compared to carbon sequestration in wetlands. Within that time frame or less, most wetlands become both net carbon and radiative sinks. Hence, peatlands do result in cooling of the Earth's climate over a longer time period as methane is oxidised quickly and removed from the atmosphere whereas atmospheric carbon dioxide is continuously absorbed. Throughout the Holocene (the past 12,000 years), peatlands have been persistent terrestrial carbon sinks and have had a net cooling effect, sequestering 5.6 to 38 grams of carbon per square metre per year. On average, it has been estimated that today northern peatlands sequester 20-30 grams of carbon per square meter per year.

Peatlands insulate the permafrost in subarctic regions, thus delaying thawing during summer, as well as inducing the formation of permafrost. As the global climate continues to warm, wetlands could become major carbon sources as higher temperatures cause higher carbon dioxide emissions.

Compared with untilled cropland, wetlands can sequester around two times the carbon, and planted wetlands may be able to store 2-15 times more carbon than what they release. Carbon sequestration can occur in constructed wetlands, as well as natural ones. Estimates of greenhouse gas fluxes from wetlands indicate that natural wetlands have lower fluxes, but man-made wetlands have a greater carbon sequestration capacity. The carbon sequestration abilities of wetlands can be improved through restoration and protection strategies, but it takes several decades for these restored ecosystems to become comparable in carbon storage to peatlands and other forms of natural wetlands.

Effects of drainage for agriculture and forestry 
The exchange of carbon between the mires and the atmosphere has been of current concern globally in the field of ecology and biogeochemical studies. The drainage of peatlands for agriculture and forestry has resulted in the emission of extensive greenhouse gasses into the atmosphere, most notably carbon dioxide and methane. By allowing oxygen to enter the peat column within a mire, drainage disrupts the balance between peat accumulation and decomposition, and the subsequent oxidative degradation results in the release of carbon into the atmosphere. As such, the drainage of mires for agriculture transforms them from net carbon sinks to net carbon emitters. However, the emission of methane from mires has been observed to decrease following drainage. Because the total magnitude of emissions from peat-land drainage is often great and rates of peat accumulation are slow, peatland carbon has been described as "irrecoverable" meaning that, if lost due to drainage, it could not be recovered within time scales relevant to climate mitigation.

When undertaken in such a way that preserves the hydrological state of a mire, the anthropogenic use of mires' resources can avoid significant greenhouse gas emissions. However, continued drainage will result in increased release of carbon, contributing to global warming. As of 2016, it was estimated that drained peatlands account for around 10% of all greenhouse gas emissions from agriculture and forestry.

Fires 
Some peatlands are being dried out by climate change. Drainage of mires due to climatic factors may also increase the risk of fires, presenting further risk of carbon and methane to release into the atmosphere. Due to their naturally high moisture content, pristine mires have a generally low risk of fire ignition. The drying of this waterlogged state means that the carbon-dense vegetation becomes vulnerable to fire. In addition, due to the oxygen deficient nature of the vegetation, the peat fires can smolder beneath the surface causing incomplete combustion of the organic matter and resulting in extreme emissions events.

In recent years, the occurrence of wildfires in peatlands has increased significantly worldwide particularly in the tropical regions. This can be attributed to a combination of drier weather and changes in land use which involve the drainage of water from the landscape. This resulting loss of biomass through combustion has led to significant emissions of greenhouse gasses both in tropical and boreal/temperate peatlands. Fire events are predicted to become more frequent with the warming and drying of the global climate.

Palm oil plantations 
Palm Oil is increasingly becoming one of the world's largest crops expanding rapidly in the past years. In comparison to alternatives, palm oil is considered to be among the most efficient sources of vegetable oil and biofuel requiring only 0.26 hectares of land to produce 1 ton of oil. Thus, palm oil has become a popular cash crop in many low-income countries providing economic opportunities for communities. With palm oil as a leading export in countries such as Indonesia and Malaysia, many smallholders have found economic success in palm oil plantations. However, the land sequestered for plantations are typically substantial carbon stores promoting biodiverse ecosystems.

Palm Oil plantations have replaced much of the forested peatlands in Southeast Asia. Historically, these regions have been seen as a dead space but estimates now state that 12.9 Mha or about 47% of peatlands in Southeast Asia were deforested by 2006. In their natural state, peatlands are waterlogged with high water tables making for an inefficient soil. To create viable soil for plantation, the mires in tropical regions of Indonesia and Malaysia are drained and cleared.

The peatland forests that are being harvested for palm oil production serve as above and below ground carbon stores containing at least 42,069 million metric tonnes (Mt) of soil carbon. This exploitation of land raises many environmental concerns, namely greenhouse gas emissions, risk of fires, and a decrease in biodiversity. The greenhouse gas emissions for palm oil planted on peatlands is estimated to be between the equivalent of 12.4 (best case) to 76.6 t CO2/ha (worst case).

In their natural state, peatlands are resistant to fire. Drainage of peatlands for palm oil plantations creates a dry layer of peat that is especially vulnerable to fires. As peat is carbon dense, fires occurring in compromised peatlands release extreme amounts of both carbon dioxide and toxic smoke into the air. Thus, these fires not only add to emissions of greenhouse gases, but also cause thousands of deaths every year.

The decrease in biodiversity creates a vulnerable ecosystem due to deforestation and drainage. Homogenous ecosystems are at an increased risk to extreme climate conditions and are less likely to recover from fires.

Management and rehabilitation 
Rehabilitation projects undertaken in North America and Europe usually focus on the rewetting of peatlands and revegetation of native species. This acts to mitigate carbon release in the short term before the new growth of vegetation provides a new source of organic litter to fuel the peat formation in the long term.

The United Nations Convention of Biological Diversity highlights peatlands as key ecosystems to be conserved and protected. The convention requires governments at all levels to present action plans for the conservation and management of wetland environments. Wetlands are also protected under the 1971 Ramsar Convention.

Global Peatlands Initiative

References

External links

Environmental terminology
Fluvial landforms
Freshwater ecology
Pedology
Types of soil
Wetlands
Peatlands